or  is a village in Narvik Municipality in Nordland county, Norway. The village is located on the eastern shore of the Tysfjorden, north of the small village of Storå. The island of Hulløya lies off the coast of Kjøpsvik.

There are regular ferry connections as part of Norwegian National Road 827 from Kjøpsvik to Drag, across the fjord. The local Kjøpsvik Church serves the residents of this part of the Tysfjord parish. The main industry in Kjøpsvik is the Norcem cement factory.

The village was the administrative centre of the old municipality of Tysfjord until 1 January 2020 when Tysfjord was dissolved.

Media gallery

References

Narvik
Villages in Nordland
Populated places of Arctic Norway